Grand Junction is a home rule municipality that is the county seat and the most populous municipality of Mesa County, Colorado, United States. The city population was 65,560 at the 2020 United States Census, making Grand Junction the 17th most populous Colorado municipality and the most populous city in western Colorado.

Description
The city has a council–manager form of government. It is a major commercial and transportation hub within the large area between the Green River and the Continental Divide, and the largest city in Colorado outside of the Front Range Corridor.

The city is along the Colorado River, at its confluence with the Gunnison River, which comes in from the south. "Grand" refers to the historical Grand River; it was renamed the Upper Colorado River in 1921. "Junction" refers to the confluence of the Colorado and Gunnison rivers. Grand Junction has been nicknamed "River City". It is near the midpoint of a  arcing valley, known as the Grand Valley; since the late 19th century it has been a major fruit-growing region. The valley was long occupied by the Ute people and earlier indigenous cultures. It was not settled by European-American farmers until the 1880s. Since the late 20th century, several wineries have been established in the area.

The Colorado National Monument, a unique series of canyons and mesas, overlooks the city on the west. Most of the area is surrounded by federal public lands managed by the US Bureau of Land Management. Interstate 70 connects the city eastward to Glenwood Springs and Denver and westward to Green River, Utah; Salt Lake City is reached to the west via Interstate 70 and U.S Route 6; and Las Vegas (via Interstate 70 and Interstate 15).

History
In September 1881, the former Ute Indian Territory was abolished and the Utes were forced into a reservation so that the U.S. government could open the area to settlers. Clinton County, Pennsylvania-born George Addison Crawford (1827–91) soon purchased a plot of land. On July 22, 1882, he incorporated the town of Grand Junction and planted Colorado's first vineyard near Palisade, Colorado, causing the area to become known as the Colorado Wine Country.
Grand Junction also has a storied past with gunfighters, miners, and early settlers of the American Southwest.

Geography
At the 2020 United States Census, the city had a total area of  (40.077 sq mi) including  (.443 sq mi) of water.

Climate
Grand Junction has a cold semi-arid climate (Köppen BSk). Grand Junction sits in a large area of high desert lands in Western Colorado. Due to its location west of the Rockies, Grand Junction does not receive as much influence from the Chinook winds as locations in Colorado east of the Front Range, yet it does receive protection from the Arctic air masses that can settle to the east of the Rockies. This is illustrated by the fact that from December to February, highs reach  only 18 days. Snow is greatest in December and January. Spring warming is gradual but quickens when nearing June; the average last freeze date is April 25. Autumn cooling is rapid, with the average first freeze date being October 11. The area receives little precipitation year-round, averaging , with no real seasonal spike. Sunshine hours are abundant, even in winter, and total just over 3,200 hours per year, or 73% of the possible total.

Demographics

Grand Junction is the principal city of the Grand Junction, CO Metropolitan Statistical Area.

As of the census of 2000, there were 41,986 people, 17,865 households, and 10,540 families residing in the city. The racial makeup of the city was 91.78% White, 0.60% African American, 0.94% Native American, 0.76% Asian, 0.12% Pacific Islander, 3.81% from other races, and 1.99% from two or more races. Hispanic or Latino of any race were 10.86% of the population.

There were 17,865 households, out of which 25.5% had children under the age of 18 living with them, 46.1% were married couples living together, 9.4% had a female householder with no husband present, and 41.0% were non-families. Of all households 33.2% were made up of individuals, and 13.8% had one living alone who was 65 years of age or older. The average household size was 2.23 and the average family size was 2.84.

In the city, the population was spread out, with 21.2% under the age of 18, 11.9% from 18 to 24, 26.3% from 25 to 44, 22.8% from 45 to 64, and 17.9% who were 65 years of age or older. The median age was 39 years. For every 100 females, there were 95.1 males. For every 100 females age 18 and over, there were 92.6 males.

The population figures are for Grand Junction only; the city abuts smaller towns and unincorporated county areas which contribute to area commerce.

The median income for a household in the city was $33,152, and the median income for a family was $43,851. Males had a median income of $31,685 versus $22,804 for females. The per capita income for the city was $19,692. About 7.5% of families and 11.9% of the population were below the poverty line, including 11.8% of those under age 18 and 9.0% of those age 65 or over.

Economy

Economic history
From the time settlers arrived in the 1880s until the 1960s, three of the main economic activities in the region were farming, fruit growing, and cattle raising.  Fruit orchards, particularly between Grand Junction and Palisade to the east, remain important to the region's reputation and economy to the present day.  Fruits most often grown are peaches, pears, apricots, plums, cherries, and, particularly since the 1980s, grapes for wine.  In this semi-arid environment, these orchards thrive from a combination of abundant sunshine and irrigation from a system of canals that divert water from the Colorado River.

Attempts were made to establish sugar beet farming and beet sugar production. The Grand Valley Sugar Company established a campaign in 1893, sending three train carloads to the Utah-Idaho Sugar Company. Several tariffs and subsidies to domestic sugar were established in the 1890s, which led to uncertainty in the market. After the 1897 Dingley Act, the company was revived in 1898 and rallied to build a sugar factory. They failed to fundraise to build the plant. At the same time, Charles N. Cox was able to organize an effort to establish a factory in 1898 as well. John F. Campion and others including James Joseph Brown, Eben Smith, Charles E. Mitchell, George Trimble, James R. McKinnie, and Charles Boettcher invested, creating the Colorado Sugar Manufacturing Company in 1899 and contracting E. H. Dyer to build a factory. The failed to succeed, so they sold the plant to local investors, who were able to make it a success. The Campion-Boettcher group then created the Great Western Sugar Company.

Retail sales have been important to the economy for decades (e.g., gasoline, and hunting and fishing related sales), and uranium mining-related activities have also been significant. Grand Junction was home to the Climax Uranium Mill, a now decommissioned mill that provided uranium ore to the US Atomic Energy Commission.

Education and healthcare have been important to the economy of the area, especially since the 1950s, with the rise of Colorado Mesa University and St. Mary's Hospital as leading employers in these fields.

Vast oil shale reserves were known to exist near Parachute, Colorado in the Piceance Basin. The oil embargoes of the 1970s and high gas prices resulted in major financial interest in the region. Exxon purchased rights and used Grand Junction as its seat of operations. The city and the surrounding Grand Valley became prosperous in the 1970s and early 1980s largely because of the effects of oil shale development. The United States, western Colorado in particular, has the largest-known concentration of oil shale in the world (according to the Bureau of Land Management) and holds an estimated 800 gigabarrels of recoverable oil, enough to meet U.S. demand for oil at current levels for 110 years. Known as the "Rock That Burns", the shale can be mined and processed to produce oil. In the past it was significantly more expensive than conventional oil. Sustained prices above $95 per barrel, however, may make extraction economically attractive in the coming years (see Oil shale economics). ExxonMobil pulled out of the region because of lower oil prices, which led to economic hardship in the region.

The economic bust, known as "Black Sunday" (May 2, 1982) to the locals, started with a phone call from the president of Exxon to Governor Richard Douglas Lamm, stating that Exxon would cut its losses while retaining mining rights to the (then and currently) uneconomic oil. The economic bust was felt statewide, as Exxon had invested more than 5 billion in the state. Colorado historian Tom Noel observed, "I think that was a definite turning point, and it was a reminder that we were a boom-and-bust state...There were parallels to the silver crash of 1893."

By 2008, the economy of Grand Junction appeared to be more diverse and stable than it had been in previous decades. Major contributors to the economy were health care, tourism, agriculture, livestock, and energy mining (gas and oil). Major energy companies had once again invested large amounts of money due to increases in oil and natural gas prices (such as in the years 2005–2008). However, a major drop (in the summer of 2008) of market natural gas prices led to reduced gas well drilling and related capital expenditures in the area, significantly slowing the Grand Junction economy in 2009. Reports given in 2009 suggested that Grand Junction had once again been hard-hit economically, with one report by April 2010 listing the area as having had the largest percentage drop in employment of any "small city" in the entire United States.

By 2008, Grand Junction was being discovered by the "nation's elite business and leisure travelers" as a destination for private jet travel, with nearby Powderhorn Resort and other ski resorts a major attraction.

Top employers
According to the city's 2017 Comprehensive Annual Financial Report, the top employers are:

Sports
Grand Junction's Colorado National Monument was home to a stage in the Coors Classic bicycle race known as "The Tour of the Moon" due to the Monument's unique landscape.

Since 1958, the JUCO World Series has been played at Suplizio Field. The city also has a professional Minor League Baseball team, the Grand Junction Jackalopes, who play in the Pioneer Baseball League.

Both Suplizio Field and Stocker Stadium also host Colorado Mesa University as well as School District 51 sporting events.

Parks and recreation
The Grand Junction area has developed as a mountain biking destination, with many bikers coming from the Front Range of Colorado, the Salt Lake City area, and as far away as California to enjoy the area's abundant single-track trails. Two prominent trails are the Tabeguache and Kokopelli trails, the latter running from near Loma to Moab, Utah. Fruita, Colorado, with its 18-Road trail system, is within 10 miles of the city and has become a major mountain biking destination.

Education

K–12
The Mesa Valley School District No. 51 provides comprehensive K–12 public education to the Grand Junction area. School District 51 operates five high schools:

 Fruita Monument High School
 Grand Junction High School
 Central High School
 Palisade High School
 R-5 High School

In addition, the district operates numerous middle, elementary, and other types of schools, including East Middle School, Redlands Middle School, and West Middle School. District 51 partners with Western Colorado Community College (WCCC) to operate a vocational school, owned and operated by Colorado Mesa University. WCCC was formerly named UTEC.

Colleges and universities
Colorado Mesa University, a public, four-year, liberal arts college, serves as the primary provider of higher education on the Western Slope from its campus in central Grand Junction. This campus has an average enrollment of just under 10,000 students and offers a variety of degrees, including a Masters in Business Administration, Educational Leadership, and ESOL. The university also operates Western Colorado Community College, which offers associates degrees and professional certificates.

Media

Radio
The Grand Junction radio market includes all of Mesa County, Colorado. Six AM radio stations and more than 25 FM stations are licensed to broadcast from the city.

Newspapers
Grand Junction is serviced by one local newspaper, The Grand Junction Daily Sentinel. The Grand Junction area also receives newspaper influence from sources in the greater Denver front range area.

Television
Grand Junction has ABC, NBC, and CBS television station affiliates under the call signs of KJCT-TV (Channel 8), KKCO-TV (Channel 11), and KREX-TV (Channel 5), respectively. Also, Grand Junction has a Fox (Channel 4) affiliate station under the call sign of KFQX that receives news from the Denver FOX affiliate, KDVR (Channel 31) at 9 pm. KLML (Channel 20) broadcasts Cozi TV programming. KRMJ (Channel 18) is the local PBS affiliate, part of the statewide Rocky Mountain PBS network.

Infrastructure

Transportation
Grand Junction Regional Airport (formerly Walker Field Airport) serves as the major airport in the area. The airport is located in north Grand Junction on Horizon Drive. As of 2011, two-way flights to Denver, Salt Lake City, Las Vegas, Dallas, Phoenix, Los Angeles, and Houston were available.

Amtrak, the national passenger rail system, provides service to Grand Junction Station, operating its California Zephyr daily in both directions between Chicago and Emeryville, California, across the bay from San Francisco.

Bustang, Colorado's state-run bus system, provides intercity bus service to the city. There are two bus lines that include Grand Junction. The West line connects to Denver, while the Outrider line connects to Durango. Both of these have multiple stops in between the final destinations, and the West line has options to transfer to alternative lines.

Grand Valley Transit (GVT) is a regional transit system serving the Grand Valley. It operates 11 bus routes in the area as well as a "dial-a-ride" service.

The city also has plans to implement shared micromobility in the form of Electric Scooters by April 2023. The only known company is Lime, as Grand Junction is a location on the companies mobile app.

Major highways
  Interstate 70 runs from Interstate 15 in Cove Fort, Utah to Baltimore, Maryland, connecting Grand Junction to Denver, Kansas City, St. Louis, Indianapolis, and Columbus. Via Interstate 15, it connects Grand Junction with Las Vegas, Nevada, and southern California.
  U.S. Highway 6 serves 14 states, running east–west from Provincetown, Massachusetts, to Bishop, California. In Colorado, it generally runs parallel to Interstate 76 and Interstate 70.
  U.S. Highway 50 crosses 12 states, linking Ocean City, Maryland, with Sacramento, California. In Colorado, U.S. 50 connects Grand Junction with Montrose, Gunnison, and Pueblo, and to the west, it travels into the state of Utah.
  SH 340 runs east–west, starting at First Street in downtown Grand Junction, traversing the Redlands and ending at 'U.S. Highway 6 and U.S. Highway 50 in Fruita.

Notable people
 Owen Aspinall, former governor of American Samoa
 Sabré Cook, racing driver
 Charles L. Fletcher, architect and interior designer
 Ben Garland, NFL player
 Chuck Hull, inventor
 Vance Johnson, former NFL wide receiver
 Aryn Kyle, author
 Kathryn Mientka, pianist, director of the Western Slope Chamber Music Series
 Tyme Mientka, cellist, director of the Western Slope Chamber Music Series
 Annabelle Craft Moss, aviator who received Congressional Gold Medal; served in World War II with Women Airforce Service Pilots
 Bill Musgrave, former NFL player and coach
 Rick Schroder, actor and film director
 Michael Strobl, U.S. Marine, subject of a 2009 film, Taking Chance
 Dalton Trumbo, screenwriter
 Walter Walker, political leader and publisher

See also

 List of municipalities in Colorado

Notes

References

External links

 
 CDOT map of the City of Grand Junction

 
Cities in Colorado
Cities in Mesa County, Colorado
Colorado populated places on the Colorado River
Colorado Western Slope
County seats in Colorado